Molybdenum trioxide describes a family of inorganic compounds with the formula MoO3(H2O)n where n = 0, 1, 2.  These compounds are produced on the largest scale of any molybdenum compound.  The anhydrous oxide is a precursor to molybdenum metal, an important alloying agent.  It is also an important industrial catalyst. It is a yellow solid, although impure samples can appear blue or green.

Molybdenum trioxide occurs as the rare mineral molybdite.

Structure

In the gas phase, three oxygen atoms are bonded to the central molybdenum atom.  In the solid state, anhydrous MoO3 is composed of layers of distorted MoO6 octahedra in an orthorhombic crystal. The octahedra share edges and form chains which are cross-linked by oxygen atoms to form layers. The octahedra have one short molybdenum-oxygen bond to a non-bridging oxygen. Also known is a metastable (β) form of MoO3 with a WO3-like structure.

Preparation and principal reactions
MoO3 is produced industrially by roasting molybdenum disulfide, the chief ore of molybdenum:

 2 MoS2  +  7 O2   →   2 MoO3  +  4 SO2

The laboratory synthesis of the dihydrate entails acidification of aqueous solutions of sodium molybdate with perchloric acid:

Na2MoO4  +  H2O  +  2 HClO4   →  MoO3(H2O)2  +  2 NaClO4
The dihydrate loses water readily to give the monohydrate.  Both are bright yellow in color.

Molybdenum trioxide dissolves slightly in water to give "molybdic acid".  In base, it dissolves to afford the molybdate anion.

Uses
Molybdenum trioxide is used to manufacture molybdenum metal:
MoO3  +  3 H2  →   Mo  +  3 H2O
Molybdenum trioxide is also a component of the co-catalyst used in the industrial production of acrylonitrile by the oxidation of propene and ammonia.

Because of its layered structure and the ease of the Mo(VI)/Mo(V) coupling, MoO3 is of interest in electrochemical devices and displays. It has been described as "the most commonly used TMO in organic electronics applications ... it is evaporated at relatively low temperature (∼400 °C)."

References

Cited sources

External links
 
 U.S. Department of Health and Human Services National Toxicology Program
 International Molybdenum Association
 Los Alamos National Laboratory – Molybdenum

Molybdenum(VI) compounds
Transition metal oxides